This is a list of libraries in Belgium.

National and public libraries
Royal Library of Belgium (KBR), Brussels
Erfgoedbibliotheek Hendrik Conscience, Antwerp
Permeke Library, Antwerp
, the public library of Bruges
 Bibliothèque des Affaires Etrangères, which includes the Bibliothèque Africaine (est. 1885)
 Library of the Federal Service of Justice; Brussels.
 Library of the Royal Botanic Society, Meise.
 Library of the National Archives.
 Library of the Chanchelor of the Prime Ministers' Cabinet.

Museum libraries 
 Library of the AMSAB, Social History, Ghent.
 Library of the Design Museum Ghent.
 Library of the Institute Dr. Ghuislain, Ghent.
 Library of the MIAT, Ghent.
 Library of the MIM, Brussels.
 Library of the MOMU, Antwerp.
 Library of the MUHKA, Antwerp.
 Library of the Passchendaele Memorial.
 Library of the Plantin-Moretus Museum.
 Library of the Royal Army museum, Brussels.
 Library of the Royal Museum of Central Africa, Tervuren.
 Library of the SMAK, Ghent.
 Library of the Jewish Museum, Brussels
 Library of the Royal Institute of Natural sciences
 Library of the Royal Museums of Fine Arts of Belgium
 Library of the Royal Museums of Art and History
 Library of the Museum Mayer van den Bergh
 Library of the Antwerp Zoo

Libraries of abbeys and religious institutions 
 Library of Affligem Abbey
 Library of Averbode Abbey
 Library of Bornem Abbey
 Library of Chevetogne Abbey
 Library of Dendermonde Abbey
 Library of Grimbergen Abbey
 Library of Keizersberg Abbey
 Library of Maredsous Abbey
 Library of Park Abbey
 Library of Tongerlo Abbey
 Library of The Carmelite monastery, Ghent
 Library of the Maior Seminary, Ghent
 Library of the Maior Seminary, Bruges
 Library of the Augustinians, Ghent

Private libraries 
 Private Library of the King, Laeken
 Bibliotheca Wittockiana
 Library of the Magistrate; Palais de Justice, Brussels
 Library of the Bar Association; Palais de Justice, Brussels.
 Library of the Bar Association; Palais de Justice, Antwerp.
 Library of the Bar Association; Palais de Justice, Ghent.

University libraries
 Library of Saint-Luc, Ghent.
 Ghent University Library (Universiteitsbibliotheek Gent)
 Academic libraries in Leuven (Universiteitsbibliotheek Leuven)
 University of Antwerp Library  (Universiteitsbibliotheek Antwerpen)
 Maurits Sabbe - Library, Leuven
 Boekentoren - Ghent University.
 Library of the Royal conservatory, Brussels.
 Library of the Royal Conservatory, Ghent.
 Library of the Lemmens Institute.
 Academic Library of Defence.
 Library of the Royal Military academy.

See also
List of libraries in the Netherlands
 Open access in Belgium

External links
Belgian Association for Documentation
List of Libraries in Belgium

References 

Belgium
Libraries
Libraries